Harald Pettersson (2 April 1903 – 10 April 1956) was a Swedish wrestler. He competed in the men's Greco-Roman lightweight at the 1928 Summer Olympics.

References

External links
 

1903 births
1956 deaths
Swedish male sport wrestlers
Olympic wrestlers of Sweden
Wrestlers at the 1928 Summer Olympics
People from Borås
Sportspeople from Västra Götaland County
20th-century Swedish people